

Colour Heugh and Bowden Doors are two crag rock formations in north Northumberland in North East England, designated as a Site of Special Scientific Interest (SSSI). The  site is described as "arguably the most impressive exposures of the early-mid Dinantian Fell Sandstone Group in the whole of northern England".

Location and natural features
Both crags expose sandstone of the Dinantian Fell Sandstone Group, enabling its alluvial sedimentary strata to be seen, and preserving the shapes of meandering river-beds.

The condition of Colour Heugh and Bowden Doors was judged to be favourable in 2009.

Bowden Doors is a well-known rock-climbing crag, with several hundred routes mapped.

See also
List of Sites of Special Scientific Interest in Northumberland

References

External links
Natural England SSSI record for Colour Heugh and Bowden Doors

Escarpments of England
Sites of Special Scientific Interest in Northumberland
Sites of Special Scientific Interest notified in 1987